Heliophanus hastatus is a spider species in the genus Heliophanus found in South Africa and Lesotho. It was first described by Wanda Wesołowska in 1986.

References

External links

Spiders described in 1986
Fauna of Lesotho
Salticidae
Spiders of South Africa
Taxa named by Wanda Wesołowska